The National Film Award for Best Audiography is one of the National Film Awards presented annually by the Directorate of Film Festivals, the organisation set up by Ministry of Information and Broadcasting, India. It is one of several awards presented for feature films and awarded with Rajat Kamal (Silver Lotus).

The award was instituted in 1976, at 24th National Film Awards and awarded annually for films produced in the year across the country, in all Indian languages; Hindi (30 awards), Malayalam (15 awards), Bengali (10 awards), Tamil (9 awards), Marathi (5 awards), Telugu, ladakhi (two each) Assamese, Sanskrit (one Each).

Since the 57th National Film Awards the award has been sub-categorised into Location sound recordist, Sound designer and Re-recordist of the final mixed track.

Winners 

Award includes 'Rajat Kamal' (Silver Lotus) and cash prize. Following are the award winners over the years:

References

External links 
 Official Page for Directorate of Film Festivals, India
 National Film Awards Archives
 National Film Awards at IMDb

Audiography